1994 is a Mexican Spanish-language documentary directed by Diego Enrique Orsono, that premiered on Netflix on May 17, 2019.

Premise
1994 explores corruption in Mexico during the tumultuous time for politics leading up to the 1994 elections, namely the protests against NAFTA and the Zapatista uprising in Chiapas in January; the assassination of Luis Donaldo Colosio Murrieta, the governing Institutional Revolutionary Party's candidate for President of Mexico, in Tijuana in March; Colosio's replacement, Ernesto Zedillo, winning the election in August; and the economic crisis after Zedillo took office in December. The series contains new interviews and archival footage of speeches, news reports and eye-witness accounts.

Notable interviewees
 Carlos Salinas de Gortari, President of Mexico (1988–1994)
 Subcomandante Galeano (formerly Marcos), Zapatista leader and spokesman
 Agustín Basave Benítez, advisor to Colosio's campaign
 Cuauhtémoc Cárdenas, PRD candidate for President in 1988, 1994, and 2000
 Luis Donaldo Colosio Riojas, Colosio's son
 Alfonso Durazo, Colosio's private secretary
 Diego Fernández de Cevallos, PAN candidate for President in 1994
 Talina Fernández, journalist
 Gael García Bernal, actor and filmmaker, involved in Chiapas protests in 1994
 Ernesto Ruffo Appel, Governor of Baja California (1989–1995)
 Raúl Salinas de Gortari, President Salinas's brother

Episodes

See also
Crime Diaries: The Candidate, Netflix crime drama series covering the same events

References

External links
 
 

Spanish-language Netflix original programming
2019 Mexican television series debuts